Thamanat Prompow, also known as Thammanat Prompao, Yuthaphum Bophlom, Manat Bophlom, and Patchara Prompao, is the former Deputy Minister of the Agriculture and Cooperatives Ministry of Thailand. He also serves as chairman of the National Water Resources Committee (NWRC). He has long served as a political "fixer" for the military junta that assumed power in the 2014 Thai coup d'état. Thamanat has described himself as "the main artery" in Prime Minister Prayut Chan-o-cha's 17-party government coalition which Thamanat helped forge in the 2019 Thai general election. He was born on 18 August 1965.

Education
Thamanat holds a bachelor's degree from Chulachomklao Royal Military Academy, a master's degree in Buddhism from Mahachulalongkornrajavidyalaya University and a master's in political science from Ramkhamhaeng University. He has a PhD in public administration from Calamus International University and California University FCE (CUFCE). His dissertation, The forms of the local performance development and promotion with image and identity in order to increase the value-added and value-creation: a case study of Phayao Province was "posted" in the European Journal according to Thamanat. Some have suggested that the doctoral degree might be bogus. Deputy Prime Minister Wissanu Krea-ngam says it does not matter if the doctoral degree is fake as it is irrelevant. Thamanat has vowed to file around 100 lawsuits against those who he believes have lied about his past.

Military service
Thamanat served in the Royal Thai Army, rising to the rank of captain. He frequently uses his former military rank before his name and is often referred to as "Captain" by the media.

Political activists have asked the Election Commission of Thailand (EC) to answer several Thamanat-related questions: how he managed to get reinstated in the army after his long stay in Australia in "state-sponsored accommodation" and then got promoted in 1997 after returning to Thailand, and why he used the military rank of captain in documents he submitted to join the current cabinet even though his title was revoked in a Royal Thai Government Gazette announcement in September 1998.

Australian drug conviction
Manat Bophlom, now known as Thamanat Prompow, was convicted of conspiring to import heroin to Australia. The ruling was handed down on 31 March 1994 when he was sentenced to six years imprisonment. Manat served four years, then was deported upon his release. BBC Thai reporters traveled to Downing Court in Sydney to view court records. Forbidden to make photocopies, they translated a relevant court document into Thai as proof of the conviction that Thamanat continues to deny. Deputy Prime Minister Gen Prawit Wongsuwon asked the Thai people to leave the past in the past, saying the case has already been cleared up and that it was a matter concerning one person that has nothing to do with the nation. Thamanat claims he will sue the Sydney Morning Herald for defamation, although he declines to respond to their reporting.

COVID-19 mask imbroglio
A Thamanat aide, Pittinan Rak-iad, was associated with a medical mask profiteering scheme divulged on social media during the COVID-19 virus outbreak. In a statement to the press on 9 March 2020, Thamanat said that his aide had met with a man, Sornsuvee "Boy" Pooraveenasawatchari, to "discuss masks" at a Bangkok hotel. Pittinan told the press that he does not know the man and only took photos with him at a local hotel in Bangkok on 20 February because they happened to have a mutual friend. Sornsuvee claimed to have a stockpile of millions of medical masks for sale at a time when masks were in short supply at hospitals due to the viral outbreak. Pittinan did not know the man, it was their first meeting, and no deal to trade in masks was concluded, Thamanat said. Thamanat dismissed the story as an attempt to discredit him. Although Sornsuvee had posted photos on social media of himself pictured with a large stash of boxed masks, he denied knowing to whom they belonged. When reporters asked who the masks belonged to, Sornsuvee said: "No one. I've never seen them. I don't know who the owner is. I know nothing." When asked about the incident, Prime Minister Prayut Chan-o-cha refused to comment. A government order prohibits stockpiling or profiting from the sale of sanitary masks. Violators face up to seven years in prison.

Political career
Thamanat began his political career with the Thai Rak Thai Party in 1999. In the 2014 Thai general election, he ran for a seat in the House of Representatives as a Puea Thai Party candidate, but the election was declared invalid. When the National Council for Peace and Order seized power in 2014, he was one of the persons ordered to report to the National Council for Peace and Order. In 2018, Thamanat joined the Palang Pracharath Party, being appointed chairman for its northern strategy, and was elected to the House of Representatives for Phayao District 1 by defeating Arunee Chamnanya of the Puea Thai Party.

As Deputy Agriculture Minister Thamanat has been active in his support of Thai farmers. In December 2019 he proposed spending 18 billion baht to purchase 30 million latex foam pillows to prop up rubber prices for struggling growers. The proposal would require buying 150,000 tonnes of latex from Thai rubber farmers who would be paid 65 baht per kilogram instead of the market price of 40 baht. The chief of Thai Hua Rubber PLC, in favour of the idea, suggested that the pillows—estimated to cost 600 baht to manufacture—could be sold at low prices or given free to foreign tourists.

Along with several other ministers of Prime Minister Prayut's government, Thamanat was the subject of a multi-day censure debate in the Thai Parliament in February 2020. Opposition parties charged that Thamanat is ineligible to be a cabinet minister because of his criminal record, and says he lied to Parliament about his case. In the course of the debate Thamanat tried to block the admission of Australian court records, arguing that accepting an Australian court's decision as proof of his unfitness for office would be an infringement of Thai sovereignty. During the debate Thamanat went on to claim that the 3.2 kilograms of heroin he was accused of smuggling into Australia was ordinary flour. At debate's end, he was rebuked by 17 members of his own party and received fewer votes of confidence than the five other ministers involved, but kept his job as Deputy Minister of Agriculture.

On 9 September 2021, Thamanat was sacks from the cabinet due to the Royal Gazette published a royal command removing them both from their portfolios and the cabinet after he was earlier accused of being behind a move to oust Prime Minister Prayut during last week's censure debate in parliament.

On 20 January 2022, Thamanat founded the Thai Economic Party.

Personal life
Thamanat's parliamentary declaration of assets in August 2019 listed two wives, seven children, and a net worth of about A$42 million, including a Bentley, Rolls-Royce, Tesla, and Mercedes-Benz along with 12 Hermès and 13 Chanel handbags, luxury watches, and Thai Buddha amulets.

References

Further reading
 

1965 births
Living people
Thamanat Prompow
Thamanat Prompow
Thamanat Prompow
Thamanat Prompow
Thamanat Prompow
Thamanat Prompow
Thamanat Prompow
Thamanat Prompow
Thamanat Prompow
Thamanat Prompow